Kevin Grimes (born August 19, 1979) is a Canadian former professional ice hockey player.

Playing career
Kevin Grimes played his junior hockey with the Kingston Frontenacs of the OHL from 1996–1999, appearing in 175 games, recording 67 points (8G-59A).  In 18 post-season games, Grimes had 6 points (2G-4A).  He was drafted by the Colorado Avalanche in the 1997 NHL Entry Draft in the first round, 26th overall.  Despite being a first round selection, he would never play a game in the NHL.

Grimes played the 1999–2000 season with the Pee Dee Pride of the ECHL, recording 3 points (1G-2A) in 41 games, and he played 4 games with the Grand Rapids Griffins of the IHL, getting no points.  In 2000–01, Grimes played 5 games with the Griffins, getting no points, and spent 52 games with the Mobile Mysticks of the ECHL, scoring 2 points (0G-2A).  He played 8 playoff games with Mobile, earning an assist.  Grimes returned to Mobile for the 2001–02 season, earning 9 points (2G-7A) in 64 games.

Grimes then moved over to the Jackson Bandits of the ECHL in 2002–03, playing in 20 games, and getting 6 points (1G-5A) before being traded to the Greensboro Generals, where he got 8 points (1G-7A) in 54 games, for a total of 14 points (2G-12A) in 74 games.  He then played in 8 playoff games for Greensboro, scoring 2 goals.  Grimes returned to Greensboro in 2003–04, getting 6 points (2G-4A) in 55 games.  He has since retired from the game.

Career statistics

External links

1979 births
Canadian ice hockey defencemen
Colorado Avalanche draft picks
Grand Rapids Griffins (IHL) players
Greensboro Generals players
Ice hockey people from Ottawa
Jackson Bandits players
Kingston Frontenacs players
Living people
Mobile Mysticks players
National Hockey League first-round draft picks
Pee Dee Pride players